Dothan Valley ( Emek Dotan), called Sahl Arraba (سهل عرّابة) in Arabic, is a fertile tectonic valley in the northern West Bank. The region is about eleven kilometers long and four kilometers wide. There are several Palestinian towns located in and around the valley, including Arrabah, Bir al-Basha, Burqin, Yabad, Qabatiya and Kufeirit. There is also an Israeli settlement there - Mevo Dotan.

In the Bible
Dothan Valley is mentioned in the Hebrew Bible as the site where Joseph was sold by his brothers.

See also
Dothan (ancient city)

References

Valleys of the West Bank
Hebrew Bible valleys